Ipomoea cordatotriloba is a species of morning glory native to the southeastern United States, Mexico, and South America. Its common names include tievine and cotton morning glory.

There are three varieties: 
I. cordatotriloba var. australis
I. cordatotriloba var. cordatotriloba – sharppod morning glory  
I. cordatotriloba var. torreyana – Torrey's tievine

References

cordatotriloba
Flora of the Southeastern United States
Flora of Mexico
Flora of South America